Lense may refer to:

 Incorrect spelling of lens (disambiguation) for topics related to optics lens, or metaphorically related

People 
"Lense" can be a surname of German language origin. People with this surname include:
 Benjamin Lense (born 1978), German footballer
 Josef Lense (1890–1985), Austrian physicist
 Sascha Lense (born 1975), German footballer

Fictional characters 
  Elizabeth Lense, a fictional Star Trek character, see List of Star Trek characters (G–M)

See also
 Lens (disambiguation)